Henry Middlebrook Crane (June 16, 1874 – January 21, 1956) was an American engineer and pioneer in the automobile industry. He was president of Crane Motor Car Company, vice-president and engineer of Simplex Automobile Company, and designed the Pontiac Six motor for General Motors.

Crame also designed speedboat motors for three American Power Boat Association Gold Cup champions and three Harmsworth Cup winners. During World War I, he designed and oversaw the production of airplane engines for Wright-Martin which were used by both French and United States warplanes. He also chaired the Liberty Engine Test Committee and helped create Loening Aeronautical Engineering Corp. which developed and manufactured fighter planes.

In its 1924 silver anniversary Issue, Automobile Trade Journal selected Crane as one of the "Creative Workers" who played a significant role in the development and advancement of the automobile.

Early life 
Crane was born in New York City. He was the son of Elizabeth "Lily" Hoadley and Johnathan "John" Henry Crane, an officer of The Fidelity and Casualty Co. of New York City and a commissioner of the town of Jamaica in Queens, New York. By 1892, his father was with the American Casualty Insurance and Security Company and came up with the idea of salary insurance.

Crane attended various private schools before going to Phillips Exeter Academy.  He attended the Massachusetts Institute of Technology, graduating with a B.S. in mechanical engineering in 1895 and a B.S. in electrical engineering in 1896. While there, he joined the Fraternity of Delta Psi (St. Anthony Hall), was secretary and treasurer of the Exeter Club, and was the scribe of The Technology Zoo.

As a hobby, Crane started building yachts and racing boats with his brother Clinton H. Crane. Crane designed the engines, and Clinton worked on the hulls. In July 1896, the brothers sailed their El Heirie for the Seawanhaka Challenge Cup at Oyster Bay, with Clinton serving as captain. However, they lost to the Canadian yacht Glencairn. In 1898, they sailed another of their designs, the Seawanhaka, in a trial contest. 

The Crane brothers' speedboat, Vingt et Un II, was the American Power Boat Association's Gold Cup champion in 1904. It was fitted with Crane's V-8 engine that had extra exhaust valves; this 21-horsepower motor gave the boat its name which translates as "twenty-one" in French. The New York American wrote, "She starts like a bullet from a gun, and even at top speed only a ribbon of brownish green spray at her quarter and a yeasty bit of foam at her wake mark her passage through the water."

Career

American Bell Telephone Company 
In September 1896, Crane became an engineer for the American Bell Telephone Company, working at their experimental lab in Boston, Massachusetts. In June 1887, he received a patent for an earth conductor or ground wire attachment, followed by a patent for a common battery multiple switchboard in September 1897. In June 1899, Crane received a patent for a telephone toll circuit, along with T. C. Wells Jr.

Western Electric 
Crane was employed by the New York branch of Western Electric Company from November 1898 through May 1906. While with Western Electric, he worked on experimental and engineering projects with telephones and switchboards. He also developed a gasoline launch engine.

Crane & Whitman 
On October 12, 1906, Crane became the founding president and chief engineer of the Crane & Whitman Company with co-founder mechanical engineer Allen E. Whitman. The company started with $50,000 in capital stock and $14,900 of cash to "deal in motor engines". Whiteman was the company's agent, vice-president and treasurer; P. M. Erickson was its secretary; and R. W. Wasson was its superintendent. 

Crane worked on automobile design and construction in the Crane & Whitman factory on 94 West 7th Street in Bayonne, New Jersey, custom fitted to built automobiles with four-cylinder engines. The company also made engines and did custom machine work to order. They were known for only using the best available materials for each part of their engines and vehicles, including high-quality bronzes, Krupp steel, and nickel steel. 

Between 1906 and 1907, Crane & Whitman built four-cylinder chassis which they road tested in Europe and the United States. The Crane Model 1 had "innovations such as a shaft drive with a torque arm for drive-axle location." It may have been the first car with metering holes for crankshaft lubrication.

In 1907, Clinton Crane, then a naval architect, asked his brother's company to create a 200-horsepower engine that weighed less than 2,200 pounds for use in speedboats. Crane designed an eight-cylinder, 200-horsepower engine, the largest marine engine at the time. In water, the engine weighed 2,205 pounds with oil service, pipes, and reserve gear. Clinton noted, "Both of the requirements were satisfactorily met." 

Crane reduced the engine's weight by arranging the cylinders in a ninety-degree "V", making the crankcase half the weight of the normal vertical line arrangement. The base of the engine was a complicated shape, made in a single casting. The individually cast iron cylinders were arranged in two groups of four. He also used steel for numerous parts, rather than the traditional bronze for marine engines. Another innovation was his auxiliary exhaust ports that removed seventy to eighty percent of the exhaust gases, essentially stopping the main valves from pitting and burning out.  

Before putting this new marine engine on its boat, Crane tested the motor and clutch at his shop for three weeks, using a pulley and brake in the place of a propeller. This allowed him to test its reaction to the strains of shafting brought on by the propeller, ensuring that the engine would work perfectly at top speed. Factory testing also allowed the brothers to tune Clinton's new motorboat, the Dixie II, for a race in an unheard of week. In 1908, the Dixie II set the motorboat speed record of 31.05 knots or 35.75 statute miles, with designer Clinton steering and Crane acting as engineer. The engine achieved 220 horse-power with its true screw propeller that had elliptical blades. 

The Dixie II would go on to win 105 races, including the Gold Cup in 1908 and 1909 and the British International Race or Harmsworth Cup in 1908. Motor Boat magazine called the Dixie II the "greatest motor boat the world has ever know" in its August 10, 1909 issue, noting, "Crane & Whitman seems to have brought forward a marine motor which is better than the best of the foreign manufacturers.". Overnight, Crane's Dixie engine also brought his unknown company "in a well-merited position in the front rank."

In 1908, Crane & Whitman had forty employees and announced that they had developed a new car, the Crane Model 2, for the 1908 season. Also, in 1908, Crane designed a new six-cylinder automobile engine. However, in September 1908, The Horseless Age magazine reported that the Crane & Whitman automotive factory had closed.

Crane Motor Car Company 
Crane & Whitman became the Crane Motor Car Company on June 4, 1909, with Erickson replacing Whitman as the corporate agent. Continuing the speedboat collaborations of the Crane brothers, the Dixie III (a remodeled Dixie II) won the Harmsworth Cup and the Gold Cup in 1910, and the Dixie IV won the Harmsworth Cup in 1911.  With a new engine design, Dixie IV also set the mile record for speedboats.

The challenge of designing and building automobiles in the early days is indicated in an advertisement Crane ran in July 1911, seeking an expert tool maker for steady work and good wages. Released in 1912, the Crane Model 3 was a large "premium" car. It had a six-cylinder, 46-horsepower engine that was rated 563.7 cubic inches, giving the car to an estimated 110-horsepower. This was followed by the Crane Model 4. For the Model 4, Crane changed the engine to have two blocks of three cylinders, rather than the three pairs of two cylinders that he used in the Model 3.

Crane's cars were sold as a bare chassis as the factory produced no bodywork. Customers would take their Crane chassis to a coachbuilder, usually Brewster & Company, for a custom body and interior. In 1913, a Crane car cost nearly $9,000, with the chassis alone costing $8,000. Truly a limited production vehicle, there were only forty to sixty Crane cars made between 1912 and 1914.

Crane-Simplex 

In late 1914, the Simplex Automobile Company of New Brunswick, New Jersey bought Crane Motor Car Company to acquire Crane's engineering advances; the Crane factory in Bayonne was sold to the Car Lighting & Power Company in August 1915. Simplex was the maker of "one of the finest and most exclusive luxury cars built in the USA before World War I." Crane became the vice president and consulting engineer for Simplex.

Crane created a new car called the Crane Model 46 H.P. Six-Cylinder Simplex or the Simplex-Crane Model 5, which was similar to his Crane Model 4 but on a longer wheelbase. The Model 5 was "fitted with a six-cylinder motor of 563 cubic inches piston displacement, developing a maximum of 110 h.p. The cylinders are of the L-head type and are cast in blocks of three, with the value springs fully enclosed." 

This 5,300-pound Simplex-Crane Model 5 was fast—reaching up to 65 or 68 miles per hour. Owners also expected a smooth ride and effortless performance. This was achieved with Crane's new design for springs that reduced lateral shock when a wheel went into a pothole or if the driver took a curve at high speed. At the time, a newspaper reported, "The six-cylinder power plant on which the Crane-Simplex Company has established its reputation for mechanical excellence, is the result of H. M. Crane's engineering genius."

Between 1915 and 1916, Crane designed and oversaw the fabrication of Crane-Simplex automobiles at the New Brunswick factory. Production was limited to 300 cars per year, the maximum output of the company's 800 employees who worked in three shifts, day and night. Each engine went through the equivalent of 1,000 miles of road travel on a belt test that took 36 hours, as well as a block test of 48 hours. The engines were also tested for speed on the Vanderbilt track in Long Island. Other road tests included driving on bumpy surfaces, in the sand, and the mountains. In total, each engine was tested for the equivalent of 5,000 miles of travel before going to the customer. "The car had to be right or Mr. Crane would not send it out," according to Walter B. Reynolds who was chief of the final road testing department for Simplex-Crane.

Each Crane-Simplex car was custom-built and high-priced for its era; the chassis was introduced at $5,000 in 1915, increased to $6,000 in 1917, and $7,000 in 1918. The Model 5 chassis included a complete dashboard with instrumentation, front fenders, trimmed running boards, Goodrich Silvertown cord tires, an electric horn, headlamps, a reel-mounted trouble lamp, taillamp, a jack, and tools. Based on the company's catalog, customers could choose between a limousine, landaulette-limousine, touring landaulette, and enclosed bodied coach to add to their chassis. 

The seven-passenger touring model by Brewster & Company coachworks was the only body that went into regular production. Other coach builders for Crane-Simplex customers included A. T. Demarest and Co., Healey & Co., and Holbrook Co. Adding a coach to the chassis cost $1,500 for the seven-passenger touring body or $2,000 for a custom coach. By comparison, a completed Ford Model T was around $400—and the average American household income was $708 a year.

In 1916, a company executive noted, "We make the highest price car in the world." However, it did have a market; as Horseless Age magazine wrote in its review of the Simplex-Crane Model 5, "There are always people who want only the very best and are willing to pay a good price for what to the ordinary purchaser may seem minor advantages." John D. Rockefeller purchased two Simplex-Crane Model 5 cars decked with summer and winter bodies. Other owners of a Crane-Simplex automobile include Alfred Atmore Pope, Theodate Pope Riddle, John D. Rockefeller, Jr., Herbert L. Satterlee, and Frederick William Vanderbilt. In 1936, Satterlee invited Crane to drive his Simplex-Crane Model 5 as its speedometer turned to 300,000 miles.

Wright-Martin Aircraft Corporation 

In October 1915, the Wright Company of Garwood, New Jersey agreed to purchase Crane-Simplex. When the merger was completed in 1916, the company was renamed Wright-Martin Aircraft Corporation, and Crane became its vice president and chief engineer. In November 1915, Crane went to France to pick an airplane engine that could be manufactured in the United States. He secured the North American rights to make Hispano-Suiza airplane engines, "the highest type motor in the world." The Wall Street Journal noted that, "Purchase of the North American rights for the manufacture of this remarkable motor, is a particular achievement..."

Car production at New Brunswick ceased in October 1917 for World War I and never resumed; less than 500 Crane-Simplex cars were ever produced. The former automobile plant became the largest airplane motor factory in the world. There, Crane oversaw the production of the Hispano-Suiza engines. He not only engineered the 150-horsepower Hispano-Suiza but also developed and engineered the 200 and 300-horsepower Hispano-Suiza engines. 

In August 1918, Crane developed a 200-horsepower geared motor and worked on a cannon motor. The French government placed an order for 500 airplane motors with Wright-Martin in August 1916, and orders for thousands of engines soon came from the United States government. The factory delivered 700 airplane engines in October 1918 alone.

World War I 

Also for the war effort, Crane was asked to review designs for the Liberty airplane engine and made a few suggestions. In January 1919, the United States Aircraft Board asked Crane to chair the four-person Liberty Engine Test Committee with the goal "of making the Liberty airplane engine meet the highest possible standards." Later, Crane  served on the Liberty Engine Committee, which was created to oversee manufacturing development and to recommend improvements and standardizations. The Liberty engines were manufactured at the Cadillac factory in Detroit, Michigan.

In 1918, Crane worked with Grover Loening and others to create the Loening Aeronautical Engineering Corp., serving as a director. Loening Aeronautical helped develop a two-seater monoplane fighter that would use the Wright-Martin engine. Crane pushed for "lighter and higher-quality bearings as well as the higher-performance characteristics of magnetos and spark plugs..."

Wright Aeronautical Corporation 
At the war's end, Wright-Martin—which had been focused on manufacturing engines for wartime aviation—closed its operations and sold its assets. However, $3 million was earmarked to establish a new company, Wright Aeronautical Corporation that would focus on non-military aircraft and engines. Crane was the new company's vice president and chief engineer. He continued to work on advances to engines, including "an L-configuration cylinder head with Ricardo-type high-swirl combustion chambers." He worked for Wright until May 1, 1920. He then became semi-retired.

Crane-Simplex Company 
Wright Aeronautical sold the Simplex Automobile Company assets to Emlen S. Hare and his Hare's Motors in 1920. In November 1922, Crane bought the Simplex assets from Hare "with plans to revive his masterpiece." The Crane-Simplex Company was formed, however, production never resumed.

General Motors 

On July 30, 1922, Crane became a consulting engineer and technical assistant to Alfred P. Sloan, who was chairman of the board of General Motors Corporation and a classmate of Crane's at the Massachusetts Institute of Technology. In 1924, Crane worked with a team of engineers in the Chevrolet laboratory to develop an inexpensive six-cylinder car. Crane not only designed the engine but also "the only car with a short bore and a low-pressure flood system of oiling." A new car, the Pontiac Six, was created using Crane's engine and a Chevrolet chassis that had been made longer and had updated radiators and fenders. Hemings notes, "The crowning achievement that Harry Crane made at GM was his convincing Sloan to use this type of high-turbulence, high-quench cylinder head for the original Pontiac Six engine."

In 1924, Crane told Automobile Trade Journal, "The float carburetor is, to my mind, the greatest single contribution to engineering progress. This development is now practically standard equipment on all automobiles and went a long way toward giving us the flexibility and general performance that we now have." Crane was a consulting engineer for General Motors until he died in 1956.

Publications 

 "Research Promises Fuel Savings." SAE Journal 12 (January 1923): 241.
 "Automotive Engineering and its Relation to Aeronautics." ICAC Papers (1920): 81–84.
 "Possible Effect of Aircraft Engine Development in Automobile Practice." SAE Journal 4 (April 1919): 240–42.
 "The Future Passenger Car." SAE Transactions 14 (1919): 155–156.
 "Water and Air Cooled Aviation Motors." Aero World 1:4 (November 1916): 63–67.
 "Engines of Dixie IV." The Rudder (October 1911): 177–178.

Professional affiliations 
Crane was a member and president of the Society of Automotive Engineers (SAE). In February 1920, he presented a paper on "Possible Effect of Aircraft Engine Development in Automobile Practice" for the national meeting of SAE. In 1920, he was chairman of the SAE Aeronautic Division of the Standards Committee, helping to write the American Air Safety Code for the U.S. Department of Commerce. In 1920, he also was chairman of the SAE Automobile Lighting Division of the Standards Committee, helping to reduce the glare from car headlights. 

In 1922, Crane was vice president of SAE and the research committee chairman. In 1925, he was the SAE president and advocated for better automobile headlights. The challenges he outlined were the cost of needed equipment, adjusting the light-beam when the car is pitched on it springs, inexpensive cars with inferior equipment, and setting the light beams so that they are adequate—but not blinding to approaching vehicles. Crane suggested that regulations and enforcement were needed to solve the problem.

In 1922, Crane testified at the United States Senate's Hearings on the High Cost of Gasoline and Other Petroleum Products. He testified about experiments conducted by the SAE research committee with the United States Bureau of Standards, which aimed "to determine the economically correct grade of fuel to use" to achieve "the greatest mileage per gallon, with other operating conditions being met." Tests were conducted under different weather conditions, variations in lubrication, and various drivers.

In 1922, he served on the National Advisory Committee for Aeronautics' committee on power plants for aircraft. In 1922–23, he was on the executive committee of the National Research Council's Advisory Board of Highway Research. He was also a member of the American Society of Mechanical Engineers (ASME). In 1931, he represented ASME in an advisory capacity for the Yale University Institute of Human Relations' study of human social problems. He was a member of the American Gas Association, serving on the office labor saving devices committee.

Personal 
In the 1920s, Crane lived in New York City at 44 West 44th Street. Later, he lived at the Weylin Hotel, followed by the Waldorf-Astoria Hotel. Starting in 1923, he spent the winter in Mountain Lake, Florida. In Florida, he served on the board of the Lake Wales Hospital and was a director of the Mountain Lake Corp.

He was a member of the Coffee House of New York City, the St. Anthony Club of New York, the St. Anthony Club of Boston, the Technology Club of New York, the University Club of New York, and the Recess Club of Detroit, Michigan. He belonged to the Engineers Country Club, Garden City Golf Club, the Piping Rock Club, and the Nassau Country Club where he played tennis and served as president. He was also an avid yachtsman, sailing his yachts Tuna and Meriam C.B. from Oyster Bay, Long Island. He was a member and officer of the Quincy Yacht Club, as well as being a member of the Seawanhaka Corinthian Yacht Club. He was a member of the American Flying Club and the Aero Club of America, serving as chairman of its technical committee and on its Collier Trophy committee. He was also a member of the Automobile Club of America.

On March 23, 1940, Crane held a large dance at his home in Mountain Lake. In 1956, he died at Roosevelt Hospital in New York City at the age of 81. His funeral was held at First Presbyterian Church on 12th Street in New York City. He did not marry.

References 

1874 births
1956 deaths
People from New York City
Phillips Exeter Academy alumni
St. Anthony Hall
Massachusetts Institute of Technology alumni
American automotive engineers
American mechanical engineers
American electrical engineers
American aerospace engineers
American automotive pioneers
American naval architects
General Motors designers